Mamisoa Razafindrakoto (born August 13, 1974) is a Malagasy former footballer.

He is known for letting in 149 own goals as a protest to the referee while playing for SO l'Emyrne.

Honours

Club
Stade Olympique de l'Emyrne
 THB Champions League (1) : Champion : 2005 

USCA Foot
 THB Champions League (1) : Champion : 2005 
 Coupe de Madagascar (1) : 2005

National team
Football at the Indian Ocean Island Games silver medal:2007

References

External links
 

1974 births
Living people
Malagasy footballers
Madagascar international footballers
Association football central defenders
Japan Actuel's FC players
USCA Foot players
SO Emyrne players